Atif Aslam (born 12 March 1983) is a Pakistani playback singer, songwriter, composer, and actor. He has recorded many songs in both Pakistan and India, and is known for his vocal belting, technique.

Aslam predominantly sings in Urdu, but has also sung in Hindi, Punjabi, Bengali, and Pashto. In 2008, he received the Tamgha-e-Imtiaz, the fourth-highest civilian honor award from the Pakistani government. He is also a recipient of several Lux Style Awards. Aslam made his acting debut in 2011, with the Urdu social drama film Bol. In 2019, he was awarded a star in the Dubai Walk of Fame after his nomination for the best singer in Pakistan. He was also featured in the Forbes Asia's 100 Digital Stars, published in December, 2020. He refers to his fans as "Aadeez".

Early life 
Atif Aslam was born on 12 March 1983, into a Punjabi Arain family in Wazirabad, Pakistan. He went to Kimberley Hall School in Lahore until 1991, when he moved to Rawalpindi, and continued his studies at St. Paul's Cambridge School in Satellite Town. In 1995, Aslam returned to Lahore, where he continued his studies at a Divisional Public School and College (DPSC) branch. He proceeded to attend Fazaia Inter College for his HSSC from 1999 to 2001, and later went to PICS to pursue a bachelor's degree in computer science. In an interview, Aslam revealed that his ambition around this time was to become a singer.

Career 

After separation from Jal, Aslam released his first album titled Jal Pari, on 17 July 2004, produced by Sarmad Abdul Ghafoor, having 11 tracks, which was an instant hit.

2007–2008 
Aslam's Third solo albumled Meri Ki, having 12 tracks, released in Produced by Sarmad Abdul Ghafoor. In 2008, the album was nominated in 7th Lux Style Awards in the category "Best Album". Album's song "nominated in 2009 in "MTV Music Awards" in the category "Best Rock Song".

In 2008, he recorded three versions of Pehli Nazar Mein and Bakhuda Tumhi Ho from Race and Kismat Konnection respectively composed by Pritam with lyrics by Sameer and Sayeed Qaudri respectively. Pehli Nazar Mein catapulted him to Bollywood mainstream success and also won him IIFA Award.

2009; Debut in Coke Studio 
In the 2009 romantic film Ajab Prem Ki Ghazab Kahani, he sang two songs Tu Jaane Na and Tera Hone Laga Hoon including remix versions of both songs, all were composed by Pritam with lyrics by Irshad Kamil and Ashish Pandit, which fetched him several nominations. He sang advertising Olper's Qawwali "Hum Mustafavi". In Coke Studio Season 2, his five songs were released titled as "Jal Pari", "Kinara" (co-sung by Riaz Ali Khan), "Wasta Pyar Da", "Mai Ni Main" and "Humain Kya Hua".

2011; Step into Pakistani and Indian film industry 
In 2011, he sang a song from the film F.A.L.T.U, composed by Sachin-Jigar titled "Le Ja Tu Mujhe" with lyrics written by Sameer Anjaan. The same year, he sang two songs "Hona Tha Pyar" and "Kaho Aaj Bol Do" with Hadiqa Kiani for the film Pakistani film Bol in which he was cast as the lead role.

2012 
In this year, he recorded two songs for the film Tere Naal Love Ho Gaya, "Tu Muhabbat Hai" and "Piya O Re Piya" excluding sad version of the later, compositions of Sachin-Jigar. He recorded two songs "Bol Ke Lub Azaad Hain" and "Mori Araj Suno" for the Hollywood film The Reluctant Fundamentalist.

He also performed three songs in Coke Studio's Season Five titled "Charka Nolakha", "Rabba Sacheya" and "Dholna". He also sang the advertising song "Juro Ge To Jano Ge" for Jazz Pakistan.

2013 
Main Rang Sharbaton Ka was nominated at World Music Awards in 2014 for "Best Song". "Main Rang Sharbaton Ka" fetched several awards and multiple nominations for him. Zameen Jaagti Hai and Tu Khaas Hai were released in Pakistan.

2014 
In 2014, he recorded 2 songs for the film Entertainment, "Tera Naam Doon" and "Nahi Woh Saamne". Both songs were composed by Sachin-Jigar with lyrics written by Priya Panchal. He also sang QMobile Noir i10 advertising song "Dil Se Dil" and Etisalat advertising song "Faasle".

2015 
He worked with Sachin-Jigar for the song Jeena Jeena for the film Badlapur, The song Jeena Jeena topped various charts and was one of the biggest hits of 2015, which also got him a nomination for the Filmfare award for best playback singer. Same year he also recorded Dil Kare for Ho Mann Jahaan.

Aslam's rendition of "Tajdar-e-Haram" crossed 285 million views on YouTube in July 2020, originally released in 2015, it became the first video origin in Pakistan to achieve the landmark record. The qawwali-song, originally sung by Sabri Brothers, was released on 15 August 2015 in CokeStudio Season 8 and has been viewed in 186 countries across the world. Also, it is Aslam's first individual video on YouTube to make the record.

2016 
Aslam worked with musician Arko Pravo for the chartbuster song Tere Sang Yaara from Rustom which topped "Bollywood Life" chart, got nominated for "Filmfare Award for Best Male Playback Singer". Atif worked with Mithoon for four versions of the song "Mar Jaayen" from Loveshhuda in 2016, penned by Sayeed Qaudri.

"Dil Dancer" from the movie Actor in Law released, which earned him LUX Award for best playback singer. He sang"Yaariyaan" song with Ali Zafar, composed by Sahir Ali Bagga which released on 2016 Defence Day. He collaborated with Maher Zain for the song "I'm Alive" and sang "Jal Pari" for the advertisement of Huawei Honor 5X.

2017 
At the start of the year, "Hoor" song from Hindi Medium released. After which, Romantic song "Baarish" from Half Girlfriend composed by Tanishk Bagchi and Ballad song "Musafir" from Sweetie Weds NRI were released. Romantic song "Darasal" composed by JAM8 released the same year. 2 Ballad songs "Main Agar" from Tubelight and "Jaane De" from Qarib Qarib Singlle were out, composed by Pritam and Vishal Mishra respectively. In December 2017, "Dil Diyan Gallan" from Tiger Zinda Hai released, composed by Vishal–Shekhar and lyrics by Irshad Kamil. The song has garnered over 670M views on YouTube as of January 2021. His first Bengali song "Mithe Alo" from Cockpit film was also released.

The same year, Pehli Dafa starring Aslam and Ileana D'Cruz was released, which was a composition of Shiraz Uppal. A single "Younhi" written by Atif himself released on Atif's birthday, which featured Aslam and Nicolli Dela Nina. "Noor-e-Azal" Hamd released, sung by Aslam and Abida Parveen, a composition of Shani Arshad. He also sang ISPR song "Kabhi Percham Main", which was released on 2017 Defence Day.

He performed at 16th Lux Style Awards by singing "Pakistan National Anthem" and "Us Rah Par".

2018 
In 2018, a total of 19 songs were released by Aslam. Romantic song "Dil Meri Na Sune" was composed by Himesh Reshammiya for film Genius. "O Saathi" from Baaghi 2 written by Arko, "Paniyon Sa" from Satyameva Jayate, "Tere Liye" from Namaste England and "Tera Hua" from Loveyatri were major hits in the charts. He voiced for three recreated songs "Jab Koi Baat", "Dekhte Dekhte" for Batti Gul Meter Chalu which took the "official Asian music chart number 1" and recorded "Chalte Chalte" for Mitron. Other songs include "Sehmi Hai Dhadkan", three versions of "Selfish" for Race 3 and two songs "Tum" and "O Meri Laila" from Laila Majnu lyrics by Irshad Kamil.

Pakistani song Thaam Lo from Parwaaz Hai Junoon was also released during the same year, which earned him the LUX Award for the best playback Singer. He sang "Humain Pyaar Hai Pakistan Se", released on 2018 Defence Day. "12 Bajay" was released in December 2018.

2019 
In January 2019, the "Auliya" song from Hum Chaar was released, composed by Vipin Patwa. "Baarishein" released on 13 February 2019, a day before the 2019 Pulwama Attack. He performed at 18th Lux Style Awards and sang "Mujhe Dil Se Na Bhulana" with Momina Mustehan as a tribute to Bangladeshi-Pakistani actress Shabnam.

"In Dinon" and "Anjaana" from the Superstar film were also released. Pardadari, sung by Aslam and Abida Parveen also released.

Coke Studio started with songs of Aslam in Season 12. Aaye Kuch Abr, Mubarik Mubarik and Wohi Khuda Hai were released.

The song Kinna Sona became a topic of controversy as it was originally recorded by  Aslam for the film Marjaavaan, but the track was replaced at the last minute by Indian singer Jubin Nautiyal. The song was a mix-and-match blended cover with heavy inspirations from Pakistani Sufi Islamic Qawwali music that was sung by NFAK. In June 2020, T-Series released the original cover sung by Aslam on YouTube, but was forced to remove it and immediately issued an apology after a threat-laced campaign led by various right-wing Indian nationalist figures and parties such as the Maharashtra Navnirman Sena.

2020 
In 2020, Atif released ten-year-old song "Woh Mere Bin". He also sang Zong advertisement song "Aik Naya Khaab".

In April 2020, he recited Azaan shortly after which Coke Studio released Asma-ul-Husna in May 2020, recited by Atif Aslam and produced by Zulfiqar Jabbar Khan as an expression of solidarity with humanity amid the COVID-19 pandemic. It features voices from the universe recorded by NASA, thirty three backing vocalist from across the globe and the sound of Daf with pronunciation supervised by Hafiz Idrees giving it the feat of having 4M views in just four days on YouTube and as of December 2021, it has received over 50M views. Atif Aslam worked for an ad of Infinix Mobile Zero 8. "Kadi Te Hans" released on 20 November 2020 by VELO Sound Station which got 2.5M views in two days of its release.

2021
On 26 February 2021, Atif released the song "Raat" which was a poem by Munir Niazi. A tribute to Musarrat Nazir "Chale To Kat Hi Jayega" premiered on 19 March 2021 and received 14 million views in 3 days. On 26 May 2021, Times Music released Atif's Unreleased song "Jee Len De" from the Movie Romeo Akbar Walter (RAW) starring 'John Abraham'. Atif released the song Rafta rafta on 21 July 2021. On 24 October 2021, Coke Studio released his new song ''Cricket Khidaiye'' with Faris Shafi and Talal Qureshi on the occasion of T-20 World Cup 2021. Also, this year he will do his debut drama 'Sang-e-Mah', he announced on his Instagram account and the trailers are also released.

2022
On 25 January 2022, Atif Aslam along with Aima Baig performed PSL National Anthem, the song titled as "Agay Dekh".

On 27 October 2022, Atif Aslam's "Moonrise" was released, featuring Amy Jackson.

Upcoming songs 
In an interview at Capital Talk with Hamid Mir, Atif revealed an untitled Bengali song that would be released soon. Some unreleased songs of Atif Aslam that were replaced by other Bollywood artists includes "Chashni", 

Aslam then made his solo debut concert in New Jersey in Summer Beats 2008 at Sovereign Bank Arena, which also featured Kailash Kher, Richa Sharma, and Amanat Ali. After a solo debut concert in New Jersey, Aslam returned with his band and special guests to Queens Colden Center, New York for a performance on 2 July 2010.

He continued to tour the world with headline performances at the Royal Albert Hall in London, alongside Jay Sean.

On 22 April 2012, Atif Aslam became the first Pakistani to perform in London's O2 Arena a concert spectacular to promote love, peace, and unity among Pakistan and India. Aslam performed for four hours. This was followed up by shows in Manchester and Glasgow.

In 2012, he was invited for three concerts at the World Trade Centre in Dubai. This was followed by his debut concert in Bangkok at the Centara Convention Centre on 6 October 2012.

Aslam then returned to perform in ten major Pakistani cities during his Jazz Jazba Generation Tour.

On 2 November 2012, he performed his first public concert in Malaysia.

In December 2012, Aslam was named among top performers of Dubai for 2012 alongside Pitbull, Enrique Iglesias, Il Divo, Gotye, Evanescence, and Swedish House Mafia.

Atif Aslam is the first artist from Asia, and the second artist after Bryan Adams, who is permitted to perform inside the Dashrath Rangasla National Football Stadium in Kathmandu, Nepal.

In April 2013, Aslam performed for the first time at the LG Arena in Birmingham following which he became the first artist from Asia to perform twice at London's O2 Arena. Also in concert at the O2 were Bollywood stars Shaan, Malaika Arora Khan & Bipasha Basu.

As a result of his immense popularity and fan following, Atif Aslam has also performed in Bangladesh and Kenya.

Atif Aslam performed alongside Sonu Nigam in three occasions, one of which is a concert Shaam-e-Dostana at the Putrajaya International Convention Centre in Malaysia.

Acting career 
Aslam made his acting debut in the 2011 Pakistani movie Bol along with Pakistani actress Mahira Khan.
He made his television debut by a Pakistani series Sang-e-Mah (Urdu: سنگِ ماہ, transl. Moonstone)in January 2022 on HUM TV with tragic drama and romantic plot where, he played the leading role of Hilmand. Sang-e-Mah is the second instalment in the trilogy after Sang-e-Mar Mar . it is written by Mustafa Afridi, directed by Saife Hassan and produced by Momina Duraid.Here he shared screen with actors like Sania Saeed, Nauman Ijaz, Samiya Mumtaz, Hania Amir, Kubra Khan, Zaviyar Nauman Ijaz, Omair Rana and Najiba Faiz.

Personal life 
He married educationist Sara Bharwana in Lahore on 29 March 2013.
They have two sons Abdul Ahad and Aryaan Aslam. His cousin is Muhammad Hassaan who is a famous Pakistani actor, singer and producer.

Filmography

Film

Television

Discography

Soundtrack music videos 
Atif Aslam appeared in following music videos from Pakistani and Indian feature films.

Awards and nominations

See also 
 Jal (band)
 Music of Pakistan
 List of Pakistani pop singers

References

External links 

 

 
1983 births
Living people
People from Wazirabad
Punjabi people
Bollywood playback singers
Male actors in Urdu cinema
Punjabi-language singers
Recipients of Tamgha-e-Imtiaz
Pakistani male film actors
Pakistani male singer-songwriters
Pakistani pop singers
Pakistani film actors
Pakistani playback singers
Pakistani guitarists
Urdu playback singers